The Native Brotherhood of British Columbia is a province-wide First Nations rights organization. It was founded on the 13 December, 1931, during a week long series of meetings between Haida representatives from Masset and Tsimshian representatives in the Tsimshian community of Port Simpson (a.k.a. Lax Kw'alaams).  Masset Haida chief Alfred Adams, Tsimshian ethnologist and chief William Beynon and Chief William Jeffrey were among its four founding members.  It was modelled in spirit and structure on the Alaska Native Brotherhood.

Since its absorption of the Pacific Coast Native Fishermen's Organization and its primarily Kwakwaka'wakw membership in 1942, it became oriented more towards fishing rights.

In 1945, Andy Paull and chapters centered in Coast Salish communities in BC split off to form the North American Indian Brotherhood.

The formation of the Brotherhood in BC is recounted in North Vancouver filmmaker Marie Clements' 2017 musical documentary The Road Forward.

Bibliography
 "B.C. Indian Authority Dies" (obituary for William Beynon).  Vancouver, Province, Feb. 11, 1958, p. 28.
Drucker, Philip (1958)  The Native Brotherhoods: Modern Intertribal Organizations on the Northwest Coast.  (Bureau of American Ethnology Bulletin, no. 168).  Washington.
Kew, J. E. Michael (1990) "History of Coastal British Columbia since 1846."  In Handbook of North American Indians, Volume 7: Northwest Coast, ed. by Wayne Suttles, pp. 159–168.  Washington: Smithsonian Institution.

References

First Nations organizations in British Columbia
Indigenous rights organizations in Canada